
This is a list of the 30 players who earned 2017 European Tour cards through Q School in 2016.

 2017 European Tour rookie

Five of the thirty had competed in the First Stage of 2016 qualifying:  Nathan Kimsey, Rafael Echenique, Ashley Chesters, Jamie Rutherford and Niclas Johansson.

2017 Results

* European Tour rookie in 2017
T = Tied
 The player retained his European Tour card for 2018 (finished inside the top 101 or the top 10 of the Access List).
 The player did not retain his European Tour card for 2018, but retained conditional status (finished between 102 and 147, inclusive).
 The player did not retain his European Tour card for 2018 (finished outside the top 147).

Nixon, Winther, Heisele, Canter, Widegren, and Foster regained their cards for 2018 through Q School.

Winners on the European Tour in 2017

Runners-up on the European Tour in 2017

*Tournament shortened to 54 holes due to weather

See also
2016 Challenge Tour graduates
2017 European Tour

References

External links
Official website

European Tour
European Tour Qualifying School Graduates
European Tour Qualifying School Graduates